Cis castaneus is a species of tree-fungus beetles in the family Ciidae.

The nematode species Caenorhabditis monodelphis is a free-living species that can be found in galleries inside of the fungus Ganoderma applanatum (Polyporaceae) which grows on the stump of trees a few centimeters above ground. It is phoretic on C.  castaneus.

References 

Ciidae
Beetles described in 1793